Paulo Sérgio "Paulão" Prestes (born February 15, 1988 in Monte Aprazível, São Paulo) is a Brazilian-Spanish former professional basketball player.

Professional career
Prestes was selected by the Minnesota Timberwolves, in the second round of the 2010 NBA draft. However, he never played in the NBA. During his pro club career, some of the teams Prestes played with included Pieno žvaigždės, Gran Canaria, and Paulistano/Unimed.

References

External links
 FIBA Profile
 Latinbasket.com Profile
 NBA Draft Profile
 Spanish League 
 Lithuanian League Profile 

1988 births
Living people
Baloncesto Málaga players
Basketball players at the 2007 Pan American Games
BC Pieno žvaigždės players
Brazilian expatriate basketball people in Lithuania
Brazilian expatriate basketball people in Spain
Brazilian men's basketball players
CB Axarquía players
CB Gran Canaria players
CB Granada players
CB Murcia players
Centers (basketball)
Club Athletico Paulistano basketball players
Franca Basquetebol Clube players
Liga ACB players
Minnesota Timberwolves draft picks
Mogi das Cruzes Basquete players
Novo Basquete Brasil players
Pan American Games gold medalists for Brazil
Pan American Games medalists in basketball
Spanish men's basketball players
UniCEUB/BRB players
Medalists at the 2007 Pan American Games
Sportspeople from São Paulo (state)
People from Monte Aprazível